Liberty Sculpture Park is a non-governmental nonprofit sculpture park located aside the Interstate 15 in Yermo, California, United States. The park is themed after fighting for democracy and freedom for the people of China and of the world, opposing the communist tyranny, and mourning the victims of communism.

Sculptures 
 64 Massacre Monument
 Goddess of Democracy (copy)
 Tank Man
 Crazy Horse
 The House Speaker Speaks Out, depicting Nancy Pelosi demonstrating for freedom at Tiananmen Square in 1991. She was soon controlled by local police and expelled by Chinese government.
 Li Wangyang
 Liu Xiaobo in the cage
 CCP Virus (destroyed by unknown attackers)
 CCP Virus II to replace the sculpture CCP Virus on June 5, 2022
 Liberate Hong Kong, Revolution of Our Times

References 

Non-governmental organizations